Osceola High School may refer to:

Osceola High School (Arkansas) in Osceola, Arkansas
Osceola High School (Seminole, Florida) in Seminole, Florida
Osceola High School (Kissimmee, Florida) in Kissimmee, Florida
Osceola High School (Nebraska) in Osceola, Nebraska
Osceola High School (Wisconsin) in Osceola, Wisconsin
Osceola High School (Osceola, Missouri) in Osceola, Missouri